Wenning is a surname. Notable people with the surname include:

Brian Wenning (born 1981), American skateboarder
Gregor Wenning (born 1964), German neurologist
Keith Wenning (born 1991), American football player
Michael Wenning
Pieter Wenning (1873–1921), South African painter and etcher